The Minister for Gender Equality (Danish: Ligestillingsministeriet, literally Ministry for Equality) is a Danish ministry that works on improving equal gender rights across all other ministry areas. The first Minister for Gender Equality was appointed by the Prime Minister on 1 July 1999.

Ministers of Equality 

Every Minister has held this title alongside another title. Jytte Andersen and Lotte Bundsgaard were also city and housing ministers. Henriette Kjær, Eva Kjer Hansen were social ministers. Karen Jespersen was also Social Minister, later welfare minister. Inger Støjberg was also employment minister and Lykke Friis was also climate minister. Manu Sareen, the first male Minister for Gender Equality, was also Church and Minister for Nordic Cooperation, and Ellen Trane Nørby were also Education minister. Marie Bjerre is also Minister for Digitalization.

External links 
 Official site

Gender Equality
Gender Equality
Denmark
Denmark
Women in Denmark